The MP 73 (Metro Pneu appel d'offres 1973) is rolling stock on tires for the Paris metro. It essentially equips line 6, a train being also operated on line 11 until 2022. Put into service in 1974, it is technically very close to the MP 59 with an aesthetic of MF 67 and originally a brand new dark blue livery called bleu Roi (King BLue). It constitutes, after the MP 51, the MP 55 and the MP 59, the fourth Parisian generation of rubber-tired metros.

This is the only type of rolling stock in the Paris metro for which all the trains on the market have been put into service in the space of just one year.

One MP 73 has been running on Line 11 in a four-car formation. It has intermittently operated on Line 11 since 1976. A six-car MP 73 previously operated on Line 4 on an intermittent basis until 1999, when it was moved back to Line 6. In some cases, trailers of an MP 73 would be paired with trailers of an MP 59, creating a hybrid formation. This practice ended in 1999 when the MP 55 and many MP 59 stock were retired following the arrival of the MP 89.

The future of the MP 73 is to be replaced, he will receive the Mp89 of line 4 which is in the process of finalizing automation (as of August 2022)

Santiago Metro has a forked version named NS 74. Also, the Mexico City Metro has another forked version named MP 82.

History
After equipping line 4 with rolling stock(MP 59), the RATP considers the conversion of iron lines to tires as too long and costly to be generalized within a timeframe compatible with the replacement of the oldest rolling stock. It then developed modern iron-based equipment, the MF 67, in order to quickly replace the old Sprague-Thomson trainsets. However, line 6 of the metro having an aerial route over almost half of its length, it is again equipment on tires that is chosen, in order to limit noise and vibrations with regard to local residents.

This new equipment, named MP 73, has a different appearance from the other series of equipment on tires, with angular faces similar to the MF 67, and a new royal blue livery (strong medium blue) at the bottom of the body, and light gray (limit white cream) at the top in order to better withstand the passage to the washing machine and especially the constraints of a largely outdoor operation. The interior is uniformly very light grey. The trains have five cars, two of which are motor cars with driver's cabins, one motor car without a cabin, a first-class trailer and a second-class one. The bogies are equipped with “ZZ” ribbed tires to improve grip on overhead sections in rainy weather.

The fifty MP 73 trainsets built in 1974 in record time, were put into service between July 1 and 31, 1974. They are particularly appreciated by local residents for their much lower noise than the old iron trains they replace: According to the measurements taken on the viaducts during commissioning, at equal speed and at the height of the first floor of the buildings, the MP 73 reaches 67.5 dB(A) against 80 dB(A) for the Sprague-Thomson trains. Inside the trains, the noise measured also drops sharply, from 82 to 64 dB(A).

The trains ran on automatic pilot from February 10, 1975. Until 1975, they ran alongside the few remaining Sprague-Thomson trains on line 6. Some trains are immediately transferred to reinforcement, until 1979, on line 4, and, until 1999, on line 11:
on line 4, they run alongside the MP 59 rubber-tired trainsets and are lengthened to six cars like the MP 59s on this line from 1976 to 1979; Train 6550 (M3599-N4550-A6550-B7050-?-M3600) traveled on this line in the company of another MP 73 train, also with six cars;
on line 11 in 1976 and 1978, they appeared with the MP 55, the first rubber-tired trains built between 1956 and 1958, and like the latter with four cars.

The MP 73 did not originally have glazed interior doors, at the cabin and at the intercirculations. The glazing was put in place afterwards.

From 1996, the RATP undertook the renovation of the MP 73 trains. The first renovated train was 6529 (M.3557-B.7029-A.6529-N.4529-M.3558) in July 1996. This renovation involves on a new black front like the renovated MP 59 and MF 67 of lines 3, 3 bis and 9, on the replacement of the leather seats by anti-laceration seats and new interior colors with a dominant green. Fluorescent lighting was also improved. The renovation of the entire series began in September 1998 after tests with the 6529 which served as a prototype for renovation. It was undertaken jointly by the RATP workshops in Fontenay-sous-Bois and Boissy-Saint-Léger as well as the Cannes La Bocca Industries workshops. The first refurbished trainset was brought back online in April 1999. The refurbishment program ended in 2002. In 2012, all the MP 73 trainsets in service were refurbished.

Since the end of 2017, the MP 73 upholstery has been identically renewed. On this occasion, the door leaves receive a light gray coating on their interior face, thus losing their chrome appearance, as is gradually done on various equipment in the network.
The withdrawal of MP 73 will start at the end of 2022, they are to be replaced by the MP 89 CC (used on line 4 of the Paris metro).

The only MP 73 on line 11 (6544) was reformed in July 2022.

The MP 73 was the secondary star of the film Peur sur la ville where Jean-Paul Belmondo climbed on the roof of the train.

Technical characteristics
Each power car is equipped with four  motors operating at 750 volts. They are controlled by a JH camshaft driven by a 72 V low voltage servo motor, with thirty notches. The low voltage of 72 V, also used for lighting, is supplied by a rotary converter. Braking has eleven notches on the manipulator, entirely pneumatic; it is controlled by a solenoid valve.

They have ribbed tires, lighter bodies, new aesthetics of the front end and more comfortable seats. They are equipped with the same motors (Type MP4) as the MP 68 of the Mexico City metro.

Due to steep gradients on the line, and very close stations, the trainsets keep a high M/T ratio to be able to obtain enough power in the climbs and powerful accelerations.

Like all metros with tires in Paris (except the Mp14) the brake shoes are made of wood.

Formations
It is the number of car named A which is used to designate the entire train (number present in two places on the two front faces of a train). The MP 73 trains are therefore numbered from 6501 to 6550, even if the numbers of the other cars do not always correspond. For example, a trainset of normal composition would include the following boxes: M.3501, N.4501, A.6501, B.7001 and M.3502. Even if the train had a mismatched composition, the number would remain 6501. This law is valid for all material before Mp89.

  will use trains in a 5-car formation (3M2T).

45 five-car sets are allocated to Paris Italie Depot for use  on Line 6, as shown below.

Car 3 is a former 1st class

  has use trains in a 4-car formation (3M1T).
As of 1 July 2022 (a few day before reform), 1 four-car set is allocated to Les Lilas Depot for use on Line 11, as shown below.

Another versions

The MP 86 was a test MP 73 with engines and suspensions from the MPM 76 of the Marseille metro which ran on line 11 of the Paris metro until at least 1999 in M-T-T-M composition.

The RATP obviously does not wish to communicate on this prototype, little information is available. Nevertheless, according to testimonies from people working at the workshop located in Châtelet, the MP 86 was equipped with Renault VI heavy truck drive axles and Faiveley wipers. These bogies were of the ANF brand; the traction motors were of the Alsthom MP 41 A type.

The composition of the MP 86 is also known and comes in the M-B-B-M form, i.e. two motor cars with cabin (M) and two type (B) trailers. One of the two trailers has automatic pilot equipment. The composition of the numbers was as follows, M n° 3599 & 3600, B n° 7006 & 7050. A photo of the MP 86 prototype can be seen in the book Le métro de Paris, by Gaston Jacobs (page 107), where the oar on the right of MP 55 #5513 is oar #7006, bearing the number of one of the trailers. It is no longer possible to find this train which has been deregistered. Only car B.7006 survives and circulates incorporated into train no. 6506.

Gallery

References

External links
TRUCK (bogie)

Alstom multiple units
Paris Métro rolling stock
Train-related introductions in 1974
750 V DC multiple units
Electric multiple units of France